Tony Nelson (born 30 November 1950) is a Canadian hurdler. He competed in the men's 110 metres hurdles at the 1972 Summer Olympics.

References

External links
 

1950 births
Living people
Athletes (track and field) at the 1971 Pan American Games
Athletes (track and field) at the 1972 Summer Olympics
Canadian male hurdlers
Olympic track and field athletes of Canada
Place of birth missing (living people)
Pan American Games track and field athletes for Canada